The TN postcode area, also known as the Tunbridge Wells postcode area, is a group of 40 postcode districts in England, within 24 post towns. These cover south Kent (including Royal Tunbridge Wells, Tonbridge, Ashford, Sevenoaks, Cranbrook, Edenbridge, New Romney, Romney Marsh and Tenterden) and northern and eastern East Sussex (including Hastings, Battle, Bexhill-on-Sea, Crowborough, Etchingham, Hartfield, Heathfield, Mayfield, Robertsbridge, Rye, St Leonards-on-Sea, Uckfield, Wadhurst and Winchelsea), plus very small parts of Surrey and the London Borough of Bromley.

Mail for this area is sorted at the Royal Mail Sorting Office in Rochester, which also sorts all mail from the adjoining ME postcode area.



Coverage
The approximate coverage of the postcode districts:

|-
! TN1
| TUNBRIDGE WELLS
| Tunbridge Wells (town centre)
| Tunbridge Wells
|-
! TN2
| TUNBRIDGE WELLS
| Royal Tunbridge Wells (south and east), Pembury
| Tunbridge Wells
|-
! style="background:#FFFFFF;"|TN2
| style="background:#FFFFFF;"|WADHURST
| style="background:#FFFFFF;"|
| style="background:#FFFFFF;"|non-geographic
|-
! TN3
| TUNBRIDGE WELLS
| Langton Green, Groombridge, Frant, Speldhurst, Lamberhurst
| Tunbridge Wells, Wealden
|-
! TN4
| TUNBRIDGE WELLS
| Royal Tunbridge Wells (north), Rusthall, Southborough
| Tunbridge Wells
|-
! TN5
| WADHURST
| Wadhurst, Ticehurst, Tidebrook, Stonegate
| Rother, Wealden
|-
! TN6
| CROWBOROUGH
| Black Hill, Boars Head, Burnt Oak, Castle Hill, Friars Gate, Mark Cross, Rotherfield, St Johns, Stone Cross, Town Row
| Wealden
|-
! TN7
| HARTFIELD
| Coleman's Hatch, Hartfield
| Wealden
|-
! TN8
| EDENBRIDGE
| Crockham Hill, Edenbridge
| Sevenoaks, Tandridge
|-
! TN9
| TONBRIDGE 
| Tonbridge (town centre and south)
| Tonbridge and Malling
|-
! TN10
| TONBRIDGE 
| Tonbridge (north including Higham Wood)
| Tonbridge and Malling
|-
! TN11
| TONBRIDGE
| Penshurst, Hildenborough, Hadlow, Tudeley
| Sevenoaks, Tonbridge and Malling, Tunbridge Wells
|-
! TN12
| TONBRIDGE
| Paddock Wood, Staplehurst, Brenchley, Horsmonden, Marden, East Peckham
| Maidstone, Tonbridge and Malling, Tunbridge Wells
|-
! TN13
| SEVENOAKS
| Sevenoaks, Riverhead, Dunton Green
| Sevenoaks
|-
! TN14
| SEVENOAKS
| Cudham, Knockholt, Shoreham, Otford, Hazelwood
| Bromley, Sevenoaks
|-
! TN15
| SEVENOAKS
| Kemsing, Ightham, Plaxtol, Wrotham, Sevenoaks Weald, Borough Green
| Sevenoaks, Tonbridge and Malling
|-
! TN16
| WESTERHAM
| Westerham, Biggin Hill, Tatsfield
| Sevenoaks, Bromley, Tandridge
|-
! TN17
| CRANBROOK
| Cranbrook, Goudhurst, Sissinghurst, Benenden, Frittenden
| Ashford, Tunbridge Wells
|-
! TN18
| CRANBROOK
| Hawkhurst, Sandhurst 
| Tunbridge Wells
|-
! TN19
| ETCHINGHAM
| Etchingham,  Burwash
| Rother
|-
! TN20
| MAYFIELD
| Five Ashes
| Wealden
|-
! TN21
| HEATHFIELD
| Heathfield, Broad Oak, Horam, Cross in Hand
| Rother, Wealden
|-
! TN22
| UCKFIELD
| Buxted, Isfield, Maresfield, Nutley, Uckfield
| Wealden
|-
! TN23
| ASHFORD
| Ashford (town centre), Kingsnorth, Singleton
| Ashford
|-
! TN24
| ASHFORD
| Willesborough, Kennington, Boughton Aluph, Goat Lees
| Ashford
|-
! TN25
| ASHFORD
| Challock, Wye, Stowting, Brook
| Ashford, Folkestone and Hythe
|-
! TN26
| ASHFORD
| Bethersden, Hamstreet, Shadoxhurst, Woodchurch
| Ashford
|-
! TN27
| ASHFORD
| Headcorn, Biddenden
| Ashford, Maidstone
|-
! TN28
| NEW ROMNEY
| New Romney, Greatstone-on-Sea, Littlestone-on-Sea
| Folkestone and Hythe
|-
! TN29
| ROMNEY MARSH
| Lydd
| Folkestone and Hythe
|-
! TN30
| TENTERDEN
| Tenterden, Wittersham
| Ashford
|-
! TN31
| RYE
| Rye, Camber, Northiam
| Rother
|-
! TN32
| ROBERTSBRIDGE
| Robertsbridge, Mountfield, Bodiam, Brightling
| Rother
|-
! TN33
| BATTLE
| Battle
| Rother, Wealden
|-
! TN34
| HASTINGS
| Hastings town centre
| Hastings
|-
! TN35
| HASTINGS
| Hastings, Pett, Guestling, Westfield
| Hastings, Rother
|-
! TN36
| WINCHELSEA
| Winchelsea, Icklesham
| Rother
|-
! TN37
| ST. LEONARDS-ON-SEA
| St Leonards-on-Sea
| Hastings
|-
! TN38
| ST. LEONARDS-ON-SEA
| St Leonards-on-Sea, Silverhill, Wishing Tree, North Hastings, Bulverhythe
| Hastings
|-
! TN39
| BEXHILL-ON-SEA
| Bexhill-on-Sea, Cooden
| Rother
|-
! TN40
| BEXHILL-ON-SEA
| Bexhill-on-Sea, Pebsham
| Rother
|}

Delivery offices
Main delivery offices are in Ashford, Bexhill, Biggin Hill, Cranbrook, Crowborough, Edenbridge, Heathfield, New Romney, Rye, Sevenoaks, St Leonards, Tenterden, Tonbridge, Tunbridge Wells and Uckfield. Scale Payment Delivery Offices are in Post Offices of Appledore, Bethersden, Brabourne Lees, Charing, Egerton, Etchingham, Headcorn, Marden, Robertsbridge, Smarden, Staplehurst and Woodchurch.

Map

See also
Postcode Address File
List of postcode areas in the United Kingdom

References

External links
Royal Mail's Postcode Address File
A quick introduction to Royal Mail's Postcode Address File (PAF)

Postcode areas covering South East England
Postcode areas covering London